Preeti Simoes (born 31 July 1988) is an Indian television Executive producer and producer in Mumbai. She has produced Comedy Nights with Kapil, The Kapil Sharma Show, Kanpurwale Khuranas and Gangs of Filmistaan . Simoes is well known for her romantic relationship with Indian stand-up comedian Kapil Sharma.

Personal life
Preeti Simoes was born in Bombay (now Mumbai), she has a sister, Neeti Simoes, who works with her on television show productions. Simoes and Neeti has produced a number of popular Hindi TV comedy shows.

Simoes and Kapil Sharma met each other while both are working in Comedy Circus reality show of Sony TV. She was a creative director in that show and Sharma was a contestant, amid the show Kapil Sharma did engagement with Preeti Simoes. She was girlfriend of Kapil Sharma for 8 years and was serious to get married, but they separated after Sharma announced his new partner Ginni Charath's name on Twitter.

Career
Simoes worked with Kapil Sharma on his show Comedy Nights with Kapil of Colors TV as a creative director. She also was the manager of Sharma for a long period of time, when Sharma started his show, The Kapil Sharma Show, on Sony TV, she worked as celebrity coordinator and executive producer.

Later Preeti started her own show The Drama Company on Sony TV with Krushna Abhishek. Prior to this in 2016, Krushna alleged that Preeti Simoes was behind the fight between him and Sharma and later was also responsible due to it, he did not invite Krushna on Comedy nights with Kapil show to promote his film Entertainment (2014) with Akshay Kumar.

On 24 July 2017, Preeti Simoes started her own production house, named it as 'The Little Frodo'. Neeti-Preeti produce shows together and have made multiple show with Sunil Grover, Manish Paul and others. In 2018, Preeti- Neeti produced show, Dan dana dan starring Sunil Grover and Shilpa Shinde. In 2020, Laughter Challenge season 5 winner comedian- writer Abhishek Waliya alleged Simon for not paying his due amount, despite working for them in their show, Movie Masti with Manish Paul. In response Preeti said, "Waliya was bad and had attitude problem, so we showed him door". In the same year in September, Shilpa Shinde alleged Simoes of bad behaviour.

In August 2022, Simoes sisters started filming their upcoming Disney+ Hotstar webseries with Tamanna Bhatia in Delhi.

Controversy
In 2017, Kapil Sharma filed a complaint at Oshiwara police station against Preeti Simoes, her sister and a journalist called Vicky Lalwani for allegedly demanding 25 lakh rupees from him and also alleged that Simoes used to extort money from his shows' audience, who used to see show in Film City, Mumbai and the trio in collaboration wrote multiple negative articles about him on SpotboyE, an online news portal. Before launching complaint, Sharma abused Lalwani in a telephone conversation, later leaked the conversation online and it gone viral on social media.

Filmography

References

External links 

1984 births
Living people
Indian women television producers
People from Mumbai